Cardioglossa melanogaster is a species of frog in the family Arthroleptidae. It is found in the mountains of western Cameroon (Mount Manengouba, southernmost Bamileke Plateau, Mount Nlonako, Bamenda Highlands, Rumpi Hills) and eastern Nigeria (Obudu Plateau). Common name Amiet's long-fingered frog has been coined for it.

Description
Males measure  and females  in snout–vent length. Males have extremely long third fingers and spines in the fingers and in the groin; females lack these characteristics. The dorsum and flanks show distinctive tan and black patterning. The pupil is vertical and iris is gold. The white line running under the tympanum continues beyond the eye.

The tadpoles have a stream-adapted eel-like shape with long, muscular tails, narrow fins, and a long spiracle. The body is robust and elongated.

Habitat and conservation
Cardioglossa melanogaster occurs in montane forests, including areas with dense secondary growth. Breeding takes place in streams, along which the males call. Tadpoles have been found in streams with very slow current within forest fragments and in degraded areas with farms nearby. During the day, the tadpoles were hiding under stones or dead leaves in the riverbed.

Cardioglossa melanogaster is most abundant in the higher part of its altitudinal range. It is threatened by habitat loss caused by agricultural encroachment (including plantations of tree crops), expanding human settlements, and extraction of wood for firewood and building materials. It occurs in the Bafut-Ngemba Forest Reserve in Cameroon, although this reserve requires improved protection.

References

melanogaster
Frogs of Africa
Amphibians of West Africa
Amphibians of Cameroon
Fauna of Nigeria
Amphibians described in 1972
Taxonomy articles created by Polbot
Fauna of the Cameroonian Highlands forests